Rhyddfedd Frych (435? -?), sometimes called Rhyddfedd ap Categern was, according to the genealogical lists, a late 5th century Welsh ruler. 

The name of his father, Categern, has led some scholars to identify him as the son of Cadeyern Fendigaid, and thus brother to Cadell Ddyrnllwg, King of Powys.

His actual date of birth is uncertain, as is his date of death and his entire reign.

References 

House of Gwertherion
Monarchs of Powys
5th-century Welsh monarchs